Allan Robert Young (20 January 1941 – 8 December 2009) was an English professional footballer, playing mainly as a central defender.

Start of career
He began his career as a junior with Arsenal, turning professional in April 1959. His first league match was on 26 December 1960, a 1–1 draw at Highbury against Sheffield Wednesday, with Young taking the place of the regular number five, John Snedden. Between 21 January and 11 February 1961, Young played a further three league games consecutively; a 4–2 defeat at White Hart Lane against bitter rivals (and eventual Double winners) Tottenham Hotspur, a 3–3 draw at St James' Park against Newcastle United and a 3–2 defeat at Highbury against Cardiff City.

End of career
After being in a team that conceded ten goals in three games, Young never played for Arsenal again, and joined Chelsea in November 1961 for a fee of £6,000. He remained at Stamford Bridge for over 7 years, but played in only 20 league games, never scoring, though he did play in their League Cup final win over Leicester City in 1965. In January 1969, he finally left Chelsea, joining Torquay United for a fee of £8,000. After 60 league games (one goal) for Torquay he retired from professional football.

Death
In 2009, he was diagnosed with dementia and had been put into a care home. He died on 8 December 2009.

References

External links 

1941 births
2009 deaths
Place of death missing
English footballers
Footballers from Hornsey
Association football central defenders
Arsenal F.C. players
Chelsea F.C. players
Torquay United F.C. players
Wimbledon F.C. players
English Football League players